Giffordius is a genus of air-breathing land snails, terrestrial pulmonate gastropod mollusks in the family Polygyridae.

The two known species, found on Isla de Providencia (or Old Providence), were named after the early conservationist and politician, Gifford Pinchot and his wife, Cornelia, whose expedition discovered them. These snails are unusual among polygyrids in being ovoviviparous rather than oviparous.

Species
The genus Giffordius contains the following species:
 Giffordius corneliae
 Giffordius pinchotii

See also
Pinchot South Sea Expedition

References

Polygyridae